The 1942–43 Taça de Portugal was the fifth season of the Taça de Portugal (English: Portuguese Cup), the premier Portuguese football knockout competition, organized by the Portuguese Football Federation (FPF). Clube de Futebol Os Belenenses was the defending champion but lost in the quarter-finals to Sporting Clube de Portugal. The final was played on 20 June 1943 between Benfica and Vitória de Setúbal.

Participating Teams

Primeira Divisão 
(10 Teams)
Associação Académica de Coimbra – Organismo Autónomo de Futebol
Clube de Futebol Os Belenenses
Sport Lisboa e Benfica
Unidos Futebol Clube " do Barreiro"
Leixões Sport Clube 
Sporting Clube Olhanense
Futebol Clube do Porto
Sporting Clube de Portugal
Clube de Futebol Os Unidos "de Lisboa"
Vitória Sport Clube "de Guimarães"

Segunda Divisão 
(6 Teams)
Futebol Clube Barreirense
Sporting Clube de Braga
Leça Futebol Clube
Sport Clube Sanjoanense
Lusitano Futebol Clube "Vila Real de Santo António"
Vitória Futebol Clube "de Setúbal"

First round

Results

Quarterfinals

Results

Semifinals

Results

Final

References

External links
Official webpage 
1942–43 Taça de Portugal at zerozero.pt 

Taça de Portugal seasons
Port
Taca